Richard Whitney may refer to:
 Richard Whitney (financier) (1888–1974), American financier, president of the New York Stock Exchange, convicted embezzler
 Richard Whitney (artist) (born 1946), American portrait and landscape artist
 Rich Whitney (born 1955), Illinois politician